Micropterix sicanella is a species of moth belonging to the family Micropterigidae that was described by Philipp Christoph Zeller in 1847.
It is known from mainland Italy, Sicily, Sardinia and Corsica.

Adults have been found feeding on blossoms of Cistus salviifolius.

References

Micropterigidae
Moths described in 1847
Moths of Europe
Taxa named by Philipp Christoph Zeller